Camptoscaphiella is a genus of spiders in the family Oonopidae. It was first described in 1934 by Caporiacco. , it contains 18 Asian species.

Species

Camptoscaphiella comprises the following species:
Camptoscaphiella fulva Caporiacco, 1934
Camptoscaphiella glenniei (Fage, 1946)
Camptoscaphiella gunsa Baehr, 2010
Camptoscaphiella hilaris Brignoli, 1978
Camptoscaphiella loebli Baehr, 2010
Camptoscaphiella martensi Baehr, 2010
Camptoscaphiella monteithi Baehr & Harvey, 2013
Camptoscaphiella nepalensis Baehr, 2010
Camptoscaphiella panchthar Baehr, 2010
Camptoscaphiella paquini Ubick, 2010
Camptoscaphiella potteri Baehr & Harvey, 2013
Camptoscaphiella schwendingeri Baehr, 2010
Camptoscaphiella silens Brignoli, 1976
Camptoscaphiella simoni Baehr, 2010
Camptoscaphiella sinensis Deeleman-Reinhold, 1995
Camptoscaphiella strepens Brignoli, 1976
Camptoscaphiella taplejung Baehr, 2010
Camptoscaphiella tuberans Tong & Li, 2007

References

Oonopidae
Araneomorphae genera
Spiders of Asia